Constantin Stănescu (born 9 May 1928) is a Romanian cyclist. He competed in the individual and team road race events at the 1952 Summer Olympics.

References

External links
 

1928 births
Possibly living people
Romanian male cyclists
Olympic cyclists of Romania
Cyclists at the 1952 Summer Olympics